David Fincher is an American film director who has worked on feature films, television series, and music videos. His works have been nominated for Academy Awards, Golden Globes, BAFTAs, Grammys and Emmy Awards, among other accolades. He received Academy Award for Best Director nominations for The Curious Case of Benjamin Button (2008), The Social Network (2010), and Mank (2020).

He made his directorial debut in 1992 with the science-fiction horror film Alien 3. Since then, he has gone on to direct several films in the thriller genre, including Seven (1995), The Game (1997), Fight Club (1999), Panic Room (2002), Zodiac (2007), The Girl With the Dragon Tattoo (2011), and Gone Girl (2014). He has also produced three television series for Netflix: House of Cards (2013–2018), Mindhunter (2017–present), and Love, Death and Robots (2019).

Outside of feature films, Fincher has directed music videos for artists including The Rolling Stones, Justin Timberlake and Jay-Z—for which he won two Grammy Awards for Best Music Video—Nine Inch Nails, Michael Jackson, Madonna, and Rick Springfield, among others.

Fincher also made a cameo in the 2009 French animated short film Logorama.

Film 
Director
 Alien³ (1992)
 Se7en (1995)
 The Game (1997)
 Fight Club (1999)
 Panic Room (2002)
 Zodiac (2007)
 The Curious Case of Benjamin Button (2008)
 The Social Network (2010)
 The Girl with the Dragon Tattoo (2011)
 Gone Girl (2014)
 Mank (2020)
 The Killer (2023)

Executive producer
 Lords of Dogtown (2005)
 Love and Other Disasters (2006)
 The Girl in the Spider's Web (2018)

Additional credits

Television

Music videos 

 "Dance This World Away", Rick Springfield (1984)
 "Bop Til You Drop", Rick Springfield (1984)
 "Shame", The Motels (1985)
 "Shock", The Motels (1985)
 "Celebrate Youth", Rick Springfield (1985)
 "All the Love", The Outfield (1986)
 "We Don't Have to Take Our Clothes Off", Jermaine Stewart (1986)
 "Everytime You Cry", The Outfield (1986)
 "One Simple Thing", Stabilizers (1986)
 "Stay", Howard Hewett (1986)
 "She Comes On", Wire Train (1987)
 "Endless Nights", Eddie Money (1987)
 "Downtown Train", Patty Smyth (1987)
 "I Don't Mind at All", Bourgeois Tagg (1987)
 "Notorious", Loverboy (1987)
 "Love Will Rise Again", Loverboy (1987)
 "Johnny B", The Hooters (1987)
 "Storybook Love", Willy DeVille (from The Princess Bride) (1987)
 "Can I Hold You", Colin Hay (1987)
 "No Surrender", The Outfield (1987)
 "Say You Will", Foreigner (1987)
 "Don't Tell Me the Time", Martha Davis (1987)
 "Tell It to the Moon", Martha Davis (1988)
 "Heart of Gold", Johnny Hates Jazz (1988)
 "Englishman in New York", Sting (1988)
 "Shattered Dreams" (second version),Johnny Hates Jazz (1988)
 "Get Rhythm", Ry Cooder (1988)
 "Most of All", Jody Watley (1988)
 "Roll With It", Steve Winwood (1988)
 "(It's Just) The Way That You Love Me" (version 1988), Paula Abdul (1988)
 "Holding On", Steve Winwood (1988)
 "Heart", Neneh Cherry (1989)
 "Straight Up", Paula Abdul (1989)
 "Real Love", Jody Watley (1989)
 "She's a Mystery to Me", Roy Orbison (1989)
 "Forever Your Girl", Paula Abdul (1989)
 "Express Yourself", Madonna (1989)
 "The End of the Innocence", Don Henley (1989)
 "Cold Hearted", Paula Abdul (1989)
 "(It's Just) The Way That You Love Me" (version 1989), Paula Abdul (1989)
 "Oh Father", Madonna (1989)
 "Janie's Got a Gun", Aerosmith (1989)
 "Vogue", Madonna (1990)
 "Cradle of Love", Billy Idol (1990)
 "Should She Cry", Wire Train (1990)
 "L.A. Woman", Billy Idol (1990)
 "Freedom '90", George Michael (1990)
 "Who Is It", Michael Jackson (1992)
 "Bad Girl", Madonna (1993)
 "Love Is Strong", The Rolling Stones (1994)
 "6th Avenue Heartache", The Wallflowers (1996)
 "Judith", A Perfect Circle (2000)
 "Only", Nine Inch Nails (2005)
 "Suit & Tie", Justin Timberlake and Jay-Z (2013)

References 

Fincher, David
Fincher, David
Fincher, David